Rica-rica (or sometimes simply called rica) is a type of Southeast Asian hot and spicy bumbu (spice mixture) found in Manado cuisine of North Sulawesi, Indonesia. Rica-rica uses much chopped or ground red and green chili peppers, bird's eye chili, shallots, garlic, ginger, and a pinch of salt and sugar. Such ground spices are cooked in coconut oil and mixed with lime leaf, bruised lemongrass and lime juice. In Indonesia it is a popular hot and spicy seasoning to prepare barbecued meat, seafood or chicken.

Variants

In Manado cuisine, almost all kinds of meats, poultries, freshwater fishes and seafoods can be made into rica-rica dish, however the most popular probably is ayam rica-rica (chicken rica-rica). Another main ingredients that commonly cooked as rica-rica dishes are bebek rica-rica (duck), ikan mas rica-rica (carp fish), sapi rica-rica (beef), babi rica-rica (pork), cakalang rica-rica (skipjack tuna), tude rica-rica (mackerel), udang rica-rica (shrimp), cumi rica-rica (squid), kelinci rica-rica (rabbit), to exotic bushmeats such as paniki rica-rica (fruit bat) and rintek wu'uk rica-rica (dog meat).

See also

Balado
Dabu-dabu
Woku
Paniki
Tinutuan

References

External links
Chicken rica-rica recipe
Shrimp rica-rica recipe

Indonesian cuisine
Manado cuisine